Adventuress may refer to:

A female adventurer
Adventuress (schooner)
Adventuress (dinghy)
The Adventuress, American title of the 1946 British drama film I See a Dark Stranger
An Adventuress, a 1920 American drama film directed by Fred J. Balshofer